Damien Wayne Kostyal (born December 18, 1971), better known by his ring name Damien Wayne, is an American professional wrestler. He is a 3-time holder of the  NWA National Heavyweight Championship and former holder of the NWA North American Heavyweight Championship.
He is a former AIWF World Heavyweight Champion.

Professional wrestling career
Wayne made his debut August 10, 2002, teaming with T.E. Brown against then VCW Tag Team Champions Greg Steel and Idol X.

Wayne has competed in WWE, Ring of Honor, and Full Impact Pro, where he was a member of The Heartbreak Express.

DAWG
Wayne made his  Dangerous Adrenaline Wrestling Gladiators (DAWG) debut February 19, 2011, retaining the NWA Continental Championship against Vordell Walker. On May 14, 2011, at Squared Circle Wrestling Alliance in Eden, North Carolina, Damien Wayne defeated Chance Prophet for the  DAWG Championship. He has gone on to defend the championship 50 times to date in Eight separate states, to challengers such as Julio Dinero, Johnny Calzone, D. J. Hyde, Vordell Walker, Kahagas, Cueball Carmichael, Gunner, CW Anderson & Marty Jannetty.

On November 2, 2012, Wayne was involved in an eight-way elimination match for the vacant NWA World Heavyweight Championship. The final two competitors consisted of Wayne and longtime rival Chance Prophet. NWA National Heavyweight Champion Kahagas then inserted himself into the match. From this distraction, Wayne was able to eliminate Prophet, but would go on to be defeated by Kahagas.

Damien's 1001-day DAWG Championship reign was ended on February 8, 2014 by Dirty Money on a NECW event in Beverly, Mass.

Championships and accomplishments
Allied Independent Wrestling Federations
AIWF World Heavyweight Championship (2 time, current)
	America's Most Liked Wrestling
AML Tag Team Championship (1 time, current) - with CW Anderson
Dangerous Adrenaline Wrestling Gladiators
DAWG Championship (1 time, longest reign)
G.O.U.G.E. Wrestling
G.O.U.G.E. North Carolina Championship (1 time, current)
NWA CIW
NWA Midwest Tag Team Championship (1 time, current) — with Lance Erikson
NWA EDGE
NWA National Heavyweight Championship (3 times)
NWA Fusion/NWA Virginia
NWA Virginia Heavyweight Championship/NWA Continental Heavyweight Championship (4 times)
NWA Virginia Tag Team Championship (1 time) — with Mike Booth
King of the Mid-Atlantic Tournament (2010)
NWA Pro
NWA North American Heavyweight Championship (1 time)
NWA Smoky Mountain
NWA Mid Atlantic Tag Team Championship (1 time, current) —with Lance Erikson
NWA Southern All-Star Wrestling
NWA Southern Tag Team Championship (1 time) —with Lance Erikson
NWA United States Tag Team Championship (1 time, current) — with Lance Erikson
Old School Federation
OSF Championship (1 time, current)
Pro Wrestling Illustrated
PWI ranked him #301 of the 500 best singles wrestlers of the year in the PWI 500 in 2013
Squared Circle Wrestling Alliance
SCWA Championship (1 time, current)
Vanguard Championship Wrestling
VCW Heavyweight Championship (2 time)
VCW Tag Team Championship (2 times) —with Mike Booth
VCW United States Liberty Championship (1 time)

References

External links
 Damien Wayne's profile at Cagematch.de

1971 births
Living people
Sportspeople from Hampton, Virginia
American male professional wrestlers
Professional wrestlers from Virginia
20th-century professional wrestlers
21st-century professional wrestlers
NWA National Heavyweight Champions
NWA North American Heavyweight Champions